Torill Øyunn Hanssen (born 22 September 1955) is a Norwegian politician for the Progress Party.

She served as a deputy representative to the Parliament of Norway from Nordland during the terms 1989–1993, 2001–2005 and 2005–2009. In total she met during 125 days of parliamentary session. From Mo i Rana, she was elected in the municipal council and later to Nordland county council from 2001.

References

1955 births
Living people
People from Rana, Norway
Deputy members of the Storting
Progress Party (Norway) politicians
Nordland politicians